The Raritan Bayshore is a region in central sections in the state of New Jersey. It is the area around Raritan Bay from The Amboys to Sandy Hook, in Monmouth and Middlesex counties, including the towns of Woodbridge, Perth Amboy, South Amboy, Sayreville, Old Bridge, Matawan, Aberdeen, Keyport, Union Beach, Hazlet, Keansburg, Middletown, Atlantic Highlands, and Highlands. It is the northernmost part of the Jersey Shore, located just south of New York City. At Keansburg is a traditional amusement park while at Sandy Hook are found ocean beaches. The Sadowski Parkway beach area in Perth Amboy, which lies at the mouth of the Raritan River, was deemed the "Riviera of New Jersey" by local government. In recent years many of the beaches on the Bayshore area have been rediscovered and upgraded.

Henry Hudson and the Half Moon
In September 1609, the Halve Maen (Dutch for Half Moon), anchored along the shores of the Raritan Bay, and remained for five days to explore the estuary and establish contact with local Lenape people (who later become known as the Navesink and Raritan). Four his crew were sent up the Arthur Kill and to  Newark Bay. Upon their return they were attacked and one of them, John Colman was fatally shot by arrow. Taken ashore to be buried, the spot was christened Coleman's Point.  The location Keansburg still bears the name.

Popular attractions
Popular attractions in the Bayshore area include Keansburg Amusement Park and Runaway Rapids Waterpark in Keansburg, Mount Mitchill in Atlantic Highlands, Longstreet Farm in Holmdel, and Rutgers Gardens in North Brunswick. There are also beaches in both of The Amboys, the Laurence Harbor section of Old Bridge, the Cliffwood Beach section of Aberdeen, Keyport, Union Beach, Keansburg, and Middletown. There are also non-commercial boardwalks in Perth Amboy and Keansburg

Bayshore Regional Strategic Plan
The Bayshore Regional Strategic Plan is an effort by nine municipalities in northern Monmouth County, New Jersey to reinvigorate the area's economy by emphasizing the traditional downtowns, dense residential neighborhoods, maritime history, and natural environment of the Raritan Bay coastline, especially along the Route 36 corridor along the Sandy Hook Bay.

Municipalities participating in the effort are Aberdeen, Atlantic Highlands, Hazlet, Highlands, Keansburg, Keyport, Matawan, Middletown and Union Beach.

In August 2006 a report was released, and Monmouth County was asked to vote to have the county planning board approve the plan the Bayshore organization has created.

This plan has since been replaced by the 2016 Monmouth County Master Plan, an effort to beautify, maintain, and revitalize Monmouth County.

Sandy Hook Bay
Sandy Hook Bay is a triangular arm of the Raritan Bay, along the coast of northern New Jersey in the United States. It is formed along the south side of the Lower New York Bay by Sandy Hook, a spit of land that protects the bay from the open Atlantic Ocean. The bay provides a sheltered marina for pleasure craft, as well as a harbor for the United States Coast Guard. It is fed by the Shrewsbury River estuary. It is bounded on the west side by the Naval Weapons Station Earle pier.

Nature, tourism, and recreation
The Henry Hudson Trail is a bicycling and hiking trail which runs parallel to the southern
shore of Raritan Bay and connects the bayshore communities to inland sections of Monmouth County. The trail starts in Freehold Borough and ends at Highlands.

The Bayshore area is mostly flat areas of beach, with the exception of the hills between the Navesink River and the Sandy Hook Bay. Mount Mitchill, a  hill in Atlantic Highlands, is the highest. To the east of Mount Mitchill are the Twin Lights Lighthouse of Highlands, with unobstructed views of Sandy Hook and the New York City skyline. Hartshorne Woods Park is also located in the Monmouth Hills to the south on the banks of the Navesink River.

The Gateway National Recreation Area Sandy Hook Unit on the barrier peninsula  includes two park sites:
Fort Hancock served as part of the harbor's coastal defense system from 1895 until 1974 and contains 100 historic buildings and fortifications.
Sandy Hook contains seven beaches, including Gunnison Beach, a "nude beach" by custom, as well as salt marshes and a maritime holly forest. Fishing and using hand-launched vessels are popular here.

The New Jersey Coastal Heritage Trail Route and Cheesequake State Park are also here.

Lighthouses
Chapel Hill Rear Range Light, Sandy Hook Bay (deactivated 1957)
Conover Beacon, (located in the Leonardo section of Middletown)
Great Beds Light, South Amboy
Navesink Twin Lights, Highlands
Sandy Hook Lighthouse, Sandy Hook.

Transportation

Ferry service
Ferries to New York City and Exchange Place travel across the Lower New York Bay and enter the harbor at The Narrows, a trip that take approximately 40 minutes.

SeaStreak routes connect the towns of Atlantic Highlands and Highlands to the East River at Pier 11 at Wall Street and East 34th Street Ferry Landing in New York City.

The Belford ferry slip is New York Waterway's Raritan Bayshore terminal with service to Paulus Hook Ferry Terminal in Jersey City and Wall Street-Pier 11 and West Midtown Ferry Terminal in New York City.

From Memorial Day weekend through Labor Day weekend, service is also provided to the public beaches in Sandy Hook a few times each day by SeaStreak.

North Jersey Coast Line
NJ Transit's North Jersey Coast Line crosses the Raritan River on River Draw between Perth Amboy and South Amboy continuing south to Aberdeen-Matawan, Hazlet, and Middletown.

Bus
NJ Transit bus 834 travels to the Red Bank bus terminal along Route 36.
Academy Bus runs regular service in to points in New Jersey and New York City

See also

 Regions of New Jersey
 Jersey Shore
 Raritan Bay
 Raritan River
 Navesink River
 Shrewsbury River
 Manasquan River
 Barnegat Bay

Footnotes

External links
Bayshore Regional Strategic Plan
Final Copy of the Bayshore Region Strategic Plan
 The Bayshore
 Henry Hudson Trail
 Henry Hudson Regional Alumni Association
 Hartshorne Woods Park
 Sandy Hook Bay Catamaran Club

 
Bays of New Jersey
Estuaries of New Jersey
Landforms of Monmouth County, New Jersey
Port of New York and New Jersey